"Warum?" is a song by German female pop-rap group Tic Tac Toe. The song was written by Thorsten Börger and tells about a close friend of the group members, Melanie, who had developed an addiction to drugs and died as a result of overdose. "Warum?" was released as the lead single from their second album, Klappe die 2te (1997), on 24 February 1997 and was met with commercial success, reaching number one in Germany, Austria, and Switzerland as well as number four in the Netherlands. The single sold 700,000 copies in less than two months and remains Tic Tac Toe's biggest hit.

Track listings
 German, Austrian, and Swiss CD single
 "Warum?" (single mix) – 3:22
 "Warum?" (Score I) – 4:00
 "Warum?" (Out of Space Mix) – 3:44
 "Warum?" (Score II) – 3:33

 German, Austrian, and Swiss 12-inch single
A1. "Warum?" (Out of Space Mix) – 3:44
A2. "Warum?" (single mix) – 3:22
B1. "Warum?" (Score I) – 4:00
B2. "Warum?" (Score II) – 3:33

 European CD single
 "Warum?" (single mix) – 3:22
 "Warum?" (Out of Space Mix) – 3:44

Charts

Weekly charts

Year-end charts

Certifications

References

Tic Tac Toe (band) songs
1997 singles
1997 songs
Bertelsmann Music Group singles
RCA Records singles
German-language songs
Number-one singles in Austria
Number-one singles in Germany
Number-one singles in Switzerland
Songs about drugs
Songs about friendship
Commemoration songs